The 2019 Wrestling World Cup - Women's freestyle was the first of a set of three Wrestling World Cups in 2019 which were held in Narita, Japan on 16–17 November 2019.

Pool stage

Pool A

Pool B

Medal Matches

Final ranking

See also
2019 Wrestling World Cup - Men's Greco-Roman
2019 Wrestling World Cup - Men's freestyle

References

External links

 Results book

Wrestling World Cup
2019 in sport wrestling
2019 in Japanese sport
International wrestling competitions hosted by Japan
Sport in Gunma Prefecture
November 2019 sports events in Japan